McLean High School is a public high school within the Fairfax County Public Schools in McLean, Virginia. In 2022, U.S. News & World Report rated McLean the 157th-best U.S. public high school, and third-best in Virginia.

History
Fairfax County Public Schools purchased a 22-acre tract for $32,443 for McLean High School on August 6, 1952. McLean High opened its doors on September 6, 1955, with an enrollment of 1,031 students from grades 8 through 11 with Principal Craighill S. Burks. At the time, McLean was the newest high school in Fairfax County, and the only high school located in McLean since the Franklin Sherman School, originally built in 1914, closed in the late 1930s. McLean High celebrated its 50th reunion in 2005.

The town of McLean received its name from John Roll McLean, an Ohio native who was the owner and publisher of The Washington Post and one of the founders of the Washington and Old Dominion Railroad. A railroad stop named after McLean was once located at the intersection of Old Dominion Drive and Chain Bridge Road, about a mile from the high school's current location. The McLean community combined two existing villages, Lewinsville and Langley.

Admissions
In the 2021–22 school year, McLean High School had 2361 students (as of October 2021), and its student body was:

51.3% White
25.6% Asian/Pacific Islander
12.2% Hispanic
4.4% Black
6.4% Two or More Races

Due to the school's growing enrollment, which has increased by over 550 students since 2006, the Fairfax County School Board adopted a boundary change in February 2021 to move some of McLean's students to Langley High School, which received a significant expansion during the school's recent renovation. The boundary change is being phased in gradually and will not take full effect until the 2025–26 school year, when all students from the reassigned neighborhoods will be attending Langley. While FCPS relocated a temporary modular to the McLean campus in 2021, McLean remains one of FCPS's most overcrowded high schools; FCPS has not funded a permanent addition to the school.

Curriculum
McLean High School is a fully-accredited high school based on Virginia's Standards of Learning tests. The average SAT score for McLean's Class of 2021 was 1295 (including both Critical Reading and Writing and Math), the second-highest among Fairfax County's 25 high and secondary schools. In addition, the Class of 2022 at McLean had the second-highest number of National Merit Semifinalists of any high school in Fairfax County, behind only Thomas Jefferson High School for Science and Technology, and the participation and success rates of McLean students on Advanced Placement exams typically are among the highest in Fairfax County Public Schools.

Extracurricular activities

Athletics

The school plays in the Liberty District and the Group 6A North Region. Their mascot is the Highlander, a soldier in a Scottish regiment from the Highlands. Their primary rival school is Langley High School, which is also in McLean. Other rival schools include Marshall High School in Falls Church, Madison High School in Vienna, and Yorktown High School in Arlington.

Baseball
The Highlanders baseball team is one of the most successful programs at the school, capturing numerous district titles and regional playoff berths. From 2006 to 2012, they were coached by John Thomas (MHS '96, Virginia '00) and compiled an impressive 60–31 record and district and regional playoff berths yearly. In 2009 the Highlanders captured the Liberty District regular season and tournament titles. The Highlanders ended the season with a 1–0 loss to Centreville High School in the first round of the region tournament. In 2010, the Highlanders repeated as regular-season champions and compiled a 17–3 record, 13–1 in the district, and finished 19–5. The Highlanders entered the 2010 season ranked No. 1 by the Northern Region coaches poll and held the rank for the entire season. The Washington Post ranked McLean as the 2nd best team in the entire season of the Northern Virginia/Southern Maryland/DC metro area. The Highlanders failed to win the District, falling to James Madison High School in the title game. They advanced to the quarterfinals of the Northern Region Tournament, where they lost 13–10 to Oakton High School.

In 2014, under new head coach John Dowling, the Highlanders were the Region 6A North runner-up to Chantilly High School, qualifying for the state tournament for the first time in the school's history. In 2019, Dowling's baseball team won the Liberty District championship by defeating Yorktown High School, and were favored to repeat as district champions in 2020 until the season was canceled due to COVID-19. The team repeated as Liberty District champions in 2022.

Football
McLean's football team finished the 1980 season 10–1, led by future Notre Dame and New York Giants player Eric Dorsey. The Highlanders were also one of the top teams in the Northern Region in the 1990s. In 1995, the Highlanders finished 12-1 and played Virginia powerhouse Hampton High in the state semifinal. They also won numerous district titles and went to the regional playoffs in 1992, 1996, and 1997.

The Highlanders began a slow fall from the top of the hill starting around 2001 and had losing seasons from 2002 to 2008. After an 0–10 campaign in 2008, the 2009 team rebounded to 6–5 and made the Northern Region playoffs, losing in the first round to Robert E. Lee High School. Their six wins broke the VHSL record for the best turnaround by a team. The 2009 season highlight came in beating rival school Langley High School in a 35–34 overtime bout, winning the Rotary Cup, the trophy given to the winner of every sporting match between the two schools, and the Battle of the Scots for the 1st time in 12 years. The Highlanders started the 2010 season 8–0 overall and 5–0 in district play, the best start to the program in 15 years. The Highlanders began their 2010 campaign preseason-ranked last in the district by the Washington Post, with a 1-star rating according to the online preview. After the 8–0 start in 2010, the Highlanders closed the season with an 8–3 record after losses to Stone Bridge and Langley, followed by a loss in the first round of the regional playoffs to Hayfield Secondary School.

McLean's 2011 season was another successful season for the Highlanders. The Highlanders went 6–4 in the regular season, beating archrival Langley High School 21–0 to close the regular season. The Highlanders then went over to Arlington the following week for the playoffs and fell to the eventual Division 5 runner-up Yorktown High School 20–6. After the 2011 season, it was announced that Coach Jim Patrick would be promoted to Athletics Director and that McLean had hired Thomas Jefferson High School for Science and Technology Defensive Coordinator Dennis Worek as the new head coach. After a 5–5 season in 2013, Worek retired, and Shaun Blair, a former assistant coach from Lake Braddock Secondary School, replaced him as McLean's head football coach.

After McLean went 5–5 in 2014, four losing seasons followed. In McLean's 2016 season, the Highlanders' varsity team went 1–11, their JV team was 2–10, and their first-year team was 0–8. The varsity team's only win was against Fairfax High School (Fairfax, Virginia), which was the homecoming game. The Highlanders were up by 1 when Fairfax attempted a field goal within the last minute. A McLean player blocked the field goal, and another McLean player, Amir McCormick, returned the ball for a touchdown, securing the 28–20 victory and handing McLean their only win of the season. This ending to the game was reported on multiple local news outlets as a miracle for McLean.

After back-to-back 0–10 seasons in 2017 and 2018, the Highlanders rebounded to a 5-5 regular-season record in 2019, surprising the rest of the Liberty District, which did not expect the Highlanders to field such a competitive squad. The team, headed by McLean graduate John Scholla, concluded their season with a 17–7 win over the rival Langley Saxons, the first McLean victory over Langley since 2011. Other season highlights included an opening game win over Osbourn Park and a homecoming win over Wakefield, the first home win since the 2016 homecoming stunner. The 2020 and 2021 squads finished 4-3 (second in the Liberty District) and 3–7, respectively.

Volleyball

After years of success but not titles, the Highlanders girls' volleyball team, coached by Samantha Stewart, won the Liberty District title in 2021 and advanced to the Northern Region final. One highlight of the 2021 season was defeating Langley during both the regular season and the regional playoffs.

Basketball 
The Highlanders boys basketball team is coached by Mike O'Brien, and previously was coached by Kevin Roller, who compiled an 82–69 record over six seasons.  In the 2011–12 season, under Roller, the Highlander boys won the Liberty District in a thrilling double-overtime victory over Fairfax High School. That team finished 24–4, after beating Centreville High School and Lake Braddock Secondary School in the first two rounds of the regional tournament before falling to eventual regional champion Westfield High School in the semifinals. The team enjoyed another successful season under Roller in 2012–13, finishing the year as the district runner-up and again making it to the regional playoffs. In the 2018–19 season, O'Brien's only winning season since taking over in 2013, the boys compiled a 17–10 record and finished tied for second in the Liberty District behind South Lakes High School. During the regional playoffs, led by Maine commit Matias Prock, the Highlanders defeated Oakton High School, for their first regional win since 2012, before falling to Patriot High School.

The Highlanders girls' basketball team is coached by Jen Sobota and has enjoyed more success than the boys' team in recent years. The girls' team defeated South Lakes High School to win the Liberty District championship in 2018–19, compiling an 18–7 record. District and region player-of-the-year Elizabeth Dufrane became McLean's all-time leading scorer in the 2019–20 season, in which the girls' team finished 17-10 and defeated Oakton in the regional playoffs before falling to state co-champion Madison High School in the semifinals. The new scoring record by Dufrane now sits at 1,563 points, breaking the school's previous record of 1,306.

Soccer
McLean's soccer program has consistently been among the stronger programs in the Northern Virginia region of the VHSL League. With Northern Virginia's competitive travel soccer players and other notable international students joining the program, the boys' and girls' varsity teams have enjoyed success. The McLean girls' team won the 2011 state championship; the 2021 team won both the Liberty District and Northern Region titles. The boys' team, coached by Mike Anderson, finished 7-3-1 with a young team in 2011, after having been knocked out of the state tournament in 2010 by state runners-up Battlefield High School in penalties, with a final score of 2–2. The program, headed by William Gaitan (boys) and Rob Bouchard (girls), has sent several players to competitive D1 colleges, including James Madison, Radford, George Mason, Howard, Kentucky, and Central Florida.

Ice hockey
The Highlanders are a founding member of the Northern Virginia Scholastic Hockey League and have made the playoffs at least nine times. Under the guidance of head coach John Sherlock, the Highlanders advanced to the 2010–2011 NVSHL championship game before falling 7–2 to the Stone Bridge Bulldogs. Many of the Highlanders have gone on to play in collegiate clubs around the United States and Canada.

Crew
Crew is a club sport at McLean, recognized by the Virginia Scholastic Rowing Association rather than by the Virginia High School League. In recent years, both the boys' and girls' crew teams have enjoyed considerable success, with the boys' varsity eight winning back-to-back VSRA state titles in 2018 and 2019 (one of only five schools in the state to capture more than one VSRA varsity eight championship) and the girls' varsity eight finishing as the state runner-up in 2019. In 2021, the boys' crew team won gold in all varsity 8+ events, and the girls' first varsity eight took bronze. In 2022, the boys' crew team's first varsity eight finished second to Wakefield High but again won the overall points trophy at the VSRA championships. Rowers at McLean have been recruited to numerous colleges and universities, including Boston College, Colgate, Cornell, Fordham, George Washington University, Miami, MIT, the Naval Academy, Ohio State, Princeton, Tufts, the University of Virginia, and Yale University since 2012.

Swim and Dive
The Highlander swim team has enjoyed success in the past several years, winning the Liberty District Championships in 2021. The team has had several successful athletes who have been recruited to swim and dive at Yale University, the University of Pennsylvania, University of Wisconsin, UT Austin, the US Air Force Academy, and University of Pittsburgh.

Cross country
The Highlander boys' cross-country team won the Northern Region title in 1968. The girls' cross country team won the Liberty District title in 2019 and 2021. The 2021 team went on to win the Virginia Northern Region title and eventually finished runner-up at the Virginia Class 6 state meet.

Track & field
The Highlander boys' track & field team won the Liberty District title in indoor track in 2004 and 2005. The 2004 team went on to win the outdoor Liberty District title. The girls' track & field team won the Liberty District titles in 1998 and 2012.

Esports 
Recognized by the Virginia High School League, McLean's varsity esports team was founded in 2022, joining PlayVS's Virginia VHSL Rocket League. In its debut season, the team finished 9th out of 102 teams in the regular season with a record of 6-1, qualifying it for the playoffs, where it finished top 32 in the state.

State championships and runner-up finishes
State Championships

State Runner-up finishes

McLean has also finished 1st place in the AAA Wachovia Cup for Academics in 1999–2000 and won the Washington, D.C. region's It's Academic competition in 2022.

Music programs

McLean's band program is currently conducted by Chris Weise, who took over the direction of the band at the beginning of the 2008–2009 school year. Jim Kirchenbauer, the conductor since 1982, was forced to step down from his position early because of serious health concerns. Under Mr. Kirchenbauer, the McLean band was awarded many honors, such as the Sudler Flag of Honor, an award granted by the John Philip Sousa Foundation for consistent superior musical performance, in 2000, and again in 2018 under the direction of Chris Weise. McLean remains one of only seven bands in the country who have earned the award twice. The band also traveled to the Midwest Clinic in 2006, one of the most prestigious performances a high school band can achieve.

Mclean's concert band program is divided into three main ensembles: the Concert Band, the Wind Ensemble, and the Symphonic Band (the school's premiere band). McLean also has two award-winning jazz bands under the direction of Scott Weinhold and a chamber winds program led by Deidra Denson, which performed at Music For All's 2018 Chamber Music National Festival in Indianapolis. McLean High School also has a marching band. Once the annual show is determined and created, the marching band practices for over 250 hours to achieve a final product. In both 2016 and 2017, the McLean Highlander Marching Band won the title of Virginia State Champions.

Linda Martin conducts McLean's choral program. Under Martin, the McLean chorus is ranked 9th in the nation as of 2009, the only non-performing arts school in the top 10. The chorus has also received many high-level awards and honors at local and national competitions. The program consists of four choruses: women, men, Armonia, and the Madrigals.

McLean High School alum Starlet Smith conducts the McLean Orchestra program. It consists of four orchestras: Concert, Symphonic, Sinfonia, and Philharmonic. McLean belongs to District XII of the Virginia Band & Orchestra Directors Association. The McLean High School Philharmonic Orchestra has participated in a musical exchange program with a sister school, Grabbe Gymnasium, in Detmold, Germany for over 20 years. In alternating years, musicians from the Grabbe Gymnasium travel to McLean and collaborate on a joint concert with McLean's Philharmonic Orchestra, while McLean Philharmonic musicians travel to Detmold for a similar experience with their German counterparts.

Mascot
The school considered itself "The Eagles" before becoming "The Highlanders". Girls' sports teams were known as "The Bald Eagles". The mascot was changed to its current form today in 1958 after a school-wide vote to reference instead 'the Scottish heritage' of McLean, Virginia, with boys' teams being called The Highlanders and girls' The Lady Highlanders. However, the area is not known for having any significant Scottish settlements. It is more likely that the name was inspired by the Union forces of the 79th New York "Highlanders", who fought a minor battle during the Civil War at nearby Lewinsville Park.

Newspaper
McLean also has an award-winning newspaper, The Highlander. The Highlander has existed since the school opened. In 1956, it was named the Hilltop Highlights, but changed its name in 1958.

In 2006, The Highlander was inducted into the high school newspaper Hall of Fame after ten consecutive years of being an "All American". Since the paper's first publication, it has gone from a newspaper format to a news magazine format. In 2012, the newspaper also launched a website publication, The Highlander Online.

In 2017, The Highlander was one of 49 high school publications nationwide to be named a finalist for the National Scholastic Press Association's Pacemaker Award. In 2020, The Highlander was one of 28 high school publications nationwide to be a finalist for the Pacemaker Award., and the student newspaper was one of 65 finalists for the Pacemaker Award in 2021. In 2019, The Highlander was also a finalist for the Columbia Scholastic Press Association's Crown Award for student journalism. Individual articles that have received recognition have addressed topics such as refugees in Northern Virginia, gender identity, and student-athletes with concussions.

Yearbook
The Clan was the original name of McLean's award-winning yearbook. In 2004, The Clan was inducted into the National Scholastic Press Association Hall of Fame after ten years of consecutively being "All American". The yearbook's name was changed to Caledonia in 2019.

Notable alumni

References

External links
Official website

McLean, Virginia
High schools in Fairfax County, Virginia
Northern Virginia Scholastic Hockey League teams
Educational institutions established in 1955
Public high schools in Virginia
1955 establishments in Virginia